Icarus, also known as Icarus III, is an outdoor 1973 sculpture depicting the Greek mythological figure of the same name by Michael Ayrton, installed in Old Change Court in the City of London, in the United Kingdom.

See also
 1973 in art
 Greek mythology in western art and literature
 List of public art in the City of London

References

External links
 Sculpture: Sunley and Icarus at London Remembers

1973 establishments in England
1973 sculptures
Ancient Greece in art and culture
Outdoor sculptures in London
Sculptures of classical mythology
Sculptures of men in the United Kingdom
Statues in London
City of London